XZL may refer to:

 XZL, the station code for Edmonton station, Alberta, Canada
 XZL, the station code for Xinzhen Road station, Zhejiang, China